Pholiota aurivella is a species of fungus in the family Strophariaceae that is found in native forest of New Zealand, southern Canada, and in the United States. It is frequently found in the American West and Southwest, especially in late summer and fall. Most field guides list it as inedible, with one reporting that it contains toxins which cause gastric upset. According to David Arora, the taste resembles "marshmallows without the sugar." It is sticky or slimy when moist and grows in clusters on live or dead trees.

The cap colour is bright to golden yellow, viscid when young with relatively dark scales. The stem is pale, and scaly closer to the bottom.

Pholiota limonella and its subspecies are very similar, seeming to differ only in the spores.

See also
List of Pholiota species

References

Strophariaceae
Fungi of New Zealand
Fungi of the United States
Fungi described in 1786
Inedible fungi
Taxa named by August Batsch
Fungi without expected TNC conservation status